In functional programming, an applicative functor, or an applicative for short, is an intermediate structure between functors and monads. Applicative functors allow for functorial computations to be sequenced (unlike plain functors), but don't allow using results from prior computations in the definition of subsequent ones (unlike monads). Applicative functors are the programming equivalent of lax monoidal functors with tensorial strength in category theory.

Applicative functors were introduced in 2008 by Conor McBride and Ross Paterson in their paper Applicative programming with effects.

Applicative functors first appeared as a library feature in Haskell, but have since spread to other languages as well, including  Idris, Agda, OCaml, Scala and F#. Glasgow Haskell, Idris, and F# offer language features designed to ease programming with applicative functors.
In Haskell, applicative functors are implemented in the Applicative type class.

Definition 

Consider a parametrized type f a. The pure method for an applicative of type f has type
pure :: a -> f a
and can be thought of as bringing values into the applicative. The  method for an applicative of type f has type
(<*>) :: f (a -> b) -> f a -> f b
and can be thought of as the equivalent of function application inside the applicative.

Alternatively, instead of providing , one may provide a function called liftA2. These two functions may be defined in terms of each other; therefore only one is needed for a minimally complete definition.

Applicatives are also required to satisfy four equational laws:
 Identity: 
 Composition: 
 Homomorphism: 
 Interchange: 

Every applicative is a functor.
fmap g x = pure g <*> x

Examples 

In Haskell, the Maybe type can be made an instance of the type class Applicative using the following definition:
instance Applicative Maybe where
    -- pure :: a -> Maybe a
    pure a = Just a

    -- (<*>) :: Maybe (a -> b) -> Maybe a -> Maybe b
    Nothing  <*> _        = Nothing
    _        <*> Nothing  = Nothing
    (Just g) <*> (Just x) = Just (g x)
Using the Maybe applicative for type a allows one to operate on values of type a with the error being handled automatically by the applicative machinery.
(+) <$> m <*> n
For the non-error case, adding  and  gives .
This example also demonstrates how applicatives allow a sort of generalized function application.

See also 
 Functor
 Monad

References

External links
 Description of the Applicative typeclass in the Haskell docs
 Definition of the Applicative typeclass in the Glasgow Haskell Prelude

Programming idioms
Functional programming
Software design patterns